"Afro King" is the last single by British band EMF, released in the autumn of 1995.  It was not a commercial success, peaking at #51 on the UK Singles Chart. 

The title track and tracks 2 and 3 (Too Much and Easy) of the "Part One" CD single were new songs, that have not been included on any of the band's albums, including the compilation Epsom Mad Funkers: The Best of EMF. Track 4 Bring Me Down is taken from the band's final studio album Cha Cha Cha. The "Part Two" CD single, is a 'mini' greatest hits, that includes the US Billboard number one single Unbelievable.

243-8-82410-2-1 (Part One)

Afro King (Single Version)
Too Much
Easy
Bring Me Down

CDR 6416 (Part Two)

Afro King (Single Version)
Unbelievable
Children
I Believe

References

1995 singles
EMF (band) songs